Kenny Scharf (born November 23, 1958) is an American painter known for his participation in New York City's interdisciplinary East Village art scene during the 1980s, alongside Jean-Michel Basquiat and Keith Haring. Scharf's do-it-yourself practice spanned painting, sculpture, fashion, video, performance art, and street art. Growing up in post-World War II Southern California, Scharf was fascinated by television and the futuristic promise of modern design.  His works often includes pop culture icons, such as the Flintstones and the Jetsons, or caricatures of middle-class Americans in an apocalyptic science fiction setting.

Life and career
Born in Los Angeles, Scharf moved to Manhattan, earning a BFA in painting at the School of Visual Arts in 1980. In the East Village of the 1980s, Scharf began his trademark Cosmic Caverns, immersive black light and Day-Glo paint installations that also function as ongoing disco parties. The first was known as the "Cosmic Closet" and was installed in 1981 in the Times Square apartment he shared with Keith Haring. They exhibited together a six minutes video called "The Sparkle End" (1980) in the landmark 1980 Collaborative Projects exhibition The Times Square Show.

During this period, Scharf also had important shows at Fun Gallery (1981) and Tony Shafrazi (1983, 1984, 1985), before seeing his work embraced by museums, such as the Whitney, which selected him for the 1985 Whitney Biennial. Art scribe Demetria Daniels writing in Downtown Magazine said about his work that it... "leaves you with hope, joy, play and optimism, and a sense of love...."

From then his career took off and he had international exhibitions such as with Galerie Bruno Bischofberger, Zurich (1985) or Akira Ikeda Gallery, Tokyo (1986, 1988). In 1987, Scharf designed a swing carousel for André Heller's Luna Luna, an ephemeral amusement park in Hamburg with rides designed by renowned contemporary artists.

In 2015/2016 Scharf had a one-person exhibition at the Hammer Museum. And, in 2017, he mounted "BLOX and BAX", his latest one-person exhibition at Honor Fraser Gallery in Los Angeles (his fifth with the gallery). Also in 2017 his work was featured in the large group exhibition "Fast Forward: Painting From the 1980s" at the Whitney Museum. Scharf's work was included in the October 2017 exhibition "Club 57: Film, Performance, and Art in the East Village, 1978–1983" at the Museum of Modern Art in New York.

Other one-person exhibitions of Scharf's work have been presented at the Nassau County Museum of Art, Roslyn, NY (2016); Portland Art Museum, Portland, OR (2015); Pasadena Museum of California Art, Pasadena, CA (2004); Los Angeles Contemporary Exhibitions, Los Angeles (2001); Portland Institute for Contemporary Art, OR (1999); Salvador Dalí Museum, Saint Petersburg, FL (1997); University Galleries, Illinois State University, Normal, IL (1997); Museo de Arte Contemporáneo de Monterrey, Mexico (1996); and Museum of Fort Lauderdale, Fort Lauderdale, FL (1995). His public artworks are on view at ArtCenter College of Design, Pasadena, CA; Cross Bronx Expressway on Third Avenue, Bronx, NY; Houston Street and Bowery, New York, NY; Norfolk Street, New York, NY; Pasadena Museum of California Art, Pasadena, CA; West Adams Boulevard and La Brea Avenue, Los Angeles, CA; West Hollywood Public Library, West Hollywood, CA; and many other locations around the world. His work is included in public collections such as the Bass Museum of Art, Miami Beach, FL; The Jewish Museum, New York, NY; Ludwig Museum, Cologne, Germany; Museo de Arte Contemporáneo, Monterrey, Mexico; Museu de Arte Moderna, Rio de Janeiro, Brazil; Museum of Contemporary Art, Los Angeles, CA; Museum of Modern Art, New York, NY; San Francisco Museum of Modern Art, San Francisco, CA; Sogetsu Museum, Tokyo, Japan; Stedelijk Museum, Amsterdam, the Netherlands; and the Whitney Museum of American Art, New York, NY.

Scharf is also known for welcoming collaborations with popular culture and merchandising opportunities. He designed the cover art for the 1986 B-52's album Bouncing Off the Satellites and created the 2002 pilot for The Groovenians for Adult Swim on the Cartoon Network. He has appeared in the documentaries The Universe of Keith Haring and The Nomi Song, about his friend, opera singer Klaus Nomi, as well as 2016's Kenny Scharf's World: ART/New York No. 69 by Paul Tschinkel. In 2014, he also collaborated on an accessories line with art consultant Maria Gabriela Brito. 2020 Dior luxury fashion house presents a new collection in partnership with Kenny Scharf.

Solo exhibitions (selected) 

2020

“Dystopian Painting”   Almine Rech  New York, NY.

“Moodz”   Jeffrey Deitch  Los Angeles, CA.  JULY – OCT. 2020

2019

“Optimistically Melting”   Honor  Fraser  Gallery  Los Angeles

 “Anxiously  Optimistic”  Baik Gallery   Seoul Republic Of Korea

"Universalis”   La Nave Salinas    Ibiza,  Spain

2018

“Super Pop Universe”  Lotte  Museum of Art   Seoul Korea

“Kenny  Scharf”   David Klein Gallery   Detroit,  MI.

“Paradis Perdu”  Galerie   Enrico   Navarra,   Paris

2017

“Blox and Bax”   Honor  Fraser  Gallery   Los Angeles  CA.

 “Inner and Outer Space”   Jeffrey  Deitch    New York   NY.

2016

” Kenny Scharf ”   Nassau  County  Museum  of  Art   Roslyn  Harbor,  NY .

2015

  “Born Again”  Honor  Fraser  Gallery    Los Angeles, CA.

“SCHOW”  Frederic Snitzer  Gallery   Miami, FL.

2014

“Pace Face”  By Pace Prints   NYC

 “Kenny Scharf ”  Colette, Paris

2013

“Kolors”  Paul Kasmin Gallery,  NY. NY.

“Amerikulture”  Eric  Firestone  Gallery,  East Hampton, NY.

Kenny Scharf :  “Pop Renaissance”  Honor  Fraser  Gallery,  Los Angeles, CA.

2012

“Hodgepodge”  The Honor Fraser Gallery  Los Angeles, CA.

2011

“Naturafutura”  Paul  Kasmin  Gallery  NY. NY.

2009

“Barberadise”  Honor Fraser Gallery  Los Angeles, CA.

2008

“Superdeluxa” Waddington  Gallery,  London, UK.

“80’s Back”  Seomi & Tuus, Seoul, Korea.

2007

“NEW!”  Paul Kasmin  Gallery  New York, NY.

2005

“Superpop” Paul Kasmin Gallery  New York, NY.

“Outer Limits”  Patrick Painter Gallery   Santa Monica, CA.

2004

 “Groovenian Drawings” Kantor Gallery  Los Angeles, CA.

Kenny Scharf:  “California Grown” Pasadena Museum of California Art  Los Angeles, CA.

2003

Kenny Scharf:  “Nightlight” Patrick Painter Gallery  Santa Monica, CA.

2002

“Muted”   Chac Mool Gallery  Los Angeles, CA.

2001

Kenny Scharf: “Portraits” Tony Schafrazi Gallery  New York, NY.

“Hollywood Stars” Los Angeles Contemporary Exhibitions  Los Angeles, CA.

2000

Gagosian  Gallery   Beverly Hills, CA.

Kenny Scharf : “Small Paintings & Bronzes” Tony  Shafrazi  Gallery,  New York, NY.

1999

“Heads, Small  Paintings  and  Closet # 16” Galerie Hans Mayer  Berlin, Germany.

Kenny Scharf : “New Sculpture” PICA-Portland  Institute  for Contemporary Art  Portland, OR.

“Heads and Small Paintings” Galerie Hans Mayer  Düsseldorf, Germany.

1998

“Kenny Scharf” Galerie  Ramis  Barquet   Monterrey,  Mexico

“Kenny Scharf” McIntosh  Gallery  Atlanta, GA.

“Kenny Scharf” Kantor  Gallery  Los Angeles, CA.

“Kenny Scharf” Tony Shafrazi  Gallery  New York, NY.

1997

 “Pop Surrealist”  Salvador Dalí Museum  St. Petersburg, FL.

 “When Worlds Collide”  curated by Barry

 “Kenny Scharf”  Tony Shafrazi Gallery  New York, NY.

 “Ultraelektrik” Paintings, Sculpture & Customized

1996

New Work  Tony Shafrazi  Gallery NY.

El Mundo de Kenny Scharf Museo de Art Contemporaneo de Monterrey, Mexico.

Kenny Scharf : Heads Center for the Fine Arts, Miami.

1995

Kenny Scharf : Early Paintings 1975-78  Yoshii  Gallery  NY. NY.

Kenny Scharf : Tony Shafrazi Gallery  NY. NY.

1994

Kenny Scharf : Wildlife Tony Shafrazi Gallery NY. NY.

1993

Kenny Scharf : Works on Paper, Galerie Burkhard R Eikelmann, Düsseldorf.

1992

Kenny Scharf : Edward Totah Gallery

1991

Kenny Scharf : Tony Shafrazi Gallery  NY.

Kenny Scharf : Akira Ikeda Gallery, Tokyo

1990

Kenny Scharf : Galerie Beaubourg, Paris.

1989

Kenny Scharf : Michael Kohn Gallery, Los Angeles.

1988

Kenny Scharf : Akira Ikeda Gallery, Tokyo.

1987

Kenny Scharf : Tony Shafrazi Gallery, NY.

1986

Kenny Scharf : Akira Ikeda Gallery, Tokyo.

1985

Kenny Scharf : Tony Shafrazi Gallery, NY.

Kenny Scharf : Galerie Bruno Bischofberger, Zurich.

Group Exhibitions:

Biennial 1984 Whitney Museum of Contemporary Art, NY.

1984

Kenny Scharf : Tony Shafrazi Gallery, NY.

Kenny Scharf : Gagosian Gallery, Los Angeles.

1983

Kenny Scharf : Tony Shafrazi Gallery, NY.

Kenny Scharf : American Graffiti Gallery, Amsterdam.

1982

Kenny Scharf : Fun Gallery, NY.

1981

Kenny Scharf : National Studio Artists P.S.1 Contemporary Art Center

Kenny Scharf : Customized Appliances Club 57, NY.

Kenny Scharf : The Jetsons Fun Gallery, NY.

Group Exhibitions: The Times Square Show Times Square, New York City

References

External links 

Kenny Scharf talks to the Art Newspaper.tv at the Armory Show

1958 births
Living people
20th-century American painters
American male painters
21st-century American painters
People from Hollywood, Los Angeles
Painters from California
Artists from Los Angeles
20th-century American male artists